The Svendborg Sound Bridge (Svendborgsundbroen) is a bridge that crosses Svendborg Sound between the town of Svendborg on Fyn and Vindeby on the island of Tåsinge in Denmark. It is on the road to the island of Langeland. The bridge is 1220 metres long, the longest span is 90 metres, and the maximum clearance to the sea is 33 metres.

Svendborg Sound Bridge was opened by Princess Margrethe on 18 November 1966. The bridge cost 25 million kroner.

See also
List of bridges in Denmark
List of bridges

External links
The Svendborgsund Bridge - Highways-Denmark.com
Pictures of Svendborg Sound Bridge
Picture of and data about the bridge
 
http://home.no.net/lotsberg/data/danmark/bru.html

Bridges in Denmark
Beam bridges in Denmark
Road bridges in Denmark
Bridges completed in 1966
1966 establishments in Denmark
Buildings and structures in Svendborg Municipality